Mauritius competed at the 1988 Summer Olympics in Seoul, South Korea.

Competitors
The following is the list of number of competitors in the Games.

Results and competitors by event

Athletics
Women's Marathon 
 Maryse Justin — 2"50:00 (→ 51st place)
Table Tennis (singles)
 Alain Choo Choy — 57th place (tied)
 Gilany Hosnani — 57th place (tied)
Table Tennis (doubles)
 Alain Choo Choy — 29th place (tied)
 Gilany Hosnani — 29th place (tied)

References

sports-reference
Official Olympic Reports

Nations at the 1988 Summer Olympics
1988
Oly